Philip Granville (28 July 1894 – 16 August 1954) was a Canadian racewalker. He competed in the men's 10 kilometres walk at the 1924 Summer Olympics.

References

External links
 

1894 births
1954 deaths
Athletes (track and field) at the 1924 Summer Olympics
Canadian male racewalkers
Olympic track and field athletes of Canada
Emigrants from British Jamaica to Canada
Place of birth missing